Hermes Europe GmbH is a German delivery company headquartered in Hamburg, owned by the retail company Otto GmbH.

History

The company was founded in 1972 in West Germany and entered the market in East Germany in 1990. It expanded to France in 1997, the United Kingdom in 2000, Austria in 2007, Italy in 2009 and Russia in 2010. In Germany, Hermes Logistik Gruppe (HLG) is the country's largest post independent provider of deliveries to private customers.

Evri-Hermes UK

History

In November 2020 Advent International announced it would partner with the current management team to acquire a 75% stake in Hermes UK. Otto Group will continue to own 25% of the company. Advent will also acquire a 25% stake in Hermes Germany, which includes other Hermes Germany Group companies including BorderGuru and a share in the ParcelLock joint venture. The partnership will not affect Hermes’ activities in Russia and Austria, the holding company Hermes Europe or the companies not involved in parcel delivery, namely Hermes Fulfilment, Hermes Einrichtungs Service, Girard Agediss, Hansecontrol and Otto International.

In March 2022, following allegations of poor customer service and parcel mishandling, Hermes UK announced it would rebrand as Evri.

Criticism
The company was named as the second worst parcel delivery service in the United Kingdom (after Yodel) by users of moneysavingexpert.com in January 2014, with 30% of customers rating their experience as "bad". 

In September 2016 the government asked HM Revenue and Customs to consider launching an investigation into Hermes, after workers alleged they received pay equivalent to lower than the current minimum wage in the United Kingdom. During this investigation a whistleblower claimed that Hermes coerced managers into misleading an HMRC investigation.

In June 2018 an employment tribunal in Leeds found that a group of 65 couriers, supported by the GMB union through lawyers Leigh Day, were workers entitled to employment rights, including minimum wage and holiday pay, rather than self-employed as Hermes asserted. The GMB stated the ruling was likely to affect 14,500 Hermes couriers. Hermes is considering an appeal.

During the coronavirus pandemic, Hermes said it would pay its drivers in the United Kingdom who needed to self-isolate only £20 daily, and payment would be made only to those who normally earned less than £90 daily. As a result, almost half its workers would receive nothing while payments to the rest would be capped at £280 per fortnight.

In an April 2020 episode of Channel 4's consumer show Joe Lycett's Got Your Back, it was shown that Hermes was sending parcels they claimed were undeliverable to an auction house. Host Joe Lycett contested the undeliverability of the items, finding many goods auctioned off had legible names, addresses and tracking numbers.

References

External links

Express mail
Transport companies established in 1972
Logistics companies of Germany